Unity Centre of Communist Revolutionaries of India (Marxist-Leninist) is a political party in Andhra Pradesh, India. It was formed by D.V. Rao after the 1980 general elections, as a split from the original Unity Centre of Communist Revolutionaries of India (Marxist-Leninist). D.V. Rao had been the Central Committee Secretary of UCCRI(ML). However, differences had emerged on issues like how to relate to developments in China after the death of Mao Zedong. D.V. Rao maintained that China under Deng Xiaoping remained a socialist state.

Today the party is led by Arika Gumpaswamy.

References 
 Unity Centre of Communist Revolutionaries of India (Marxist-Leninist), Indian Revolutionary Movement – Some Lessons and Experiences; Political, Organisational and Movement Review 1967–88; Adopted by the First Regular Central Conference of UCCRI(ML), April 1989. Vijayawada: Red Flag Publications, 1989
 Leftist parties in India
 Harsh Thakor, Development and Legacy of the Maoist 'Mass Revolutionary' line in India

Political parties established in 1980
Communist parties in India
Political parties in Andhra Pradesh
1980s establishments in Andhra Pradesh